Tsonevo (Цонево) is a village located in the Luda Kamchiya Valley in Dalgopol Municipality, Varna Province, Bulgaria.

References 

Villages in Varna Province